Centerville, Virginia may refer to:

Centerville, Accomack County, Virginia
Centerville, Augusta County, Virginia
Centreville, Fairfax County, Virginia
Centerville, Goochland County, Virginia
Centerville, Halifax County, Virginia
Centerville, Montgomery County, Virginia